Ave is a Roman salutation.
AVE is Alta Velocidad Española, a high speed train used in Spain.

AVE, Ave, Avé, or variants, may also refer to:

People
 Ave, pen name of the Swedish writer Eva Wigström (1832–1901)

Places
 Ave., an abbreviation for avenue, a street or road name
 Ave (intermunicipal community), a Portuguese subregion 
 Avé, Togo, a prefecture in Togo
 Ave River, Portugal
 The Ave or University Way NE, Seattle, Washington, United States

Art, entertainment, and media
 Avé (film), a 2011 Bulgarian film
 AVE, American Video Entertainment, a video game company
 AVE, Artists' Vocal Ensemble, a choir from San Francisco, California
 AVE, a Greek group of companies led by a home video distributor

Language
 AVE, African American Vernacular English, an African American variety (dialect, ethnolect and sociolect) of American English
 AVE, Avestan language (ISO 639 alpha-3, ave), an East Iranian language

Organisations
 AVE, Advanced Vehicle Engineers, a former US flying car aviation company
 AVE, Against Violent Extremism, a global network of former extremists and survivors of extremist violence

Science and technology
 Atmospheric vortex engine, a proposed technology
 Average variance extracted, a statistical theory
 PowerVM Lx86, first marketed with the name System p AVE (System p Application Virtual Environment)

See also
 Ave Maria, or Hail Mary, a traditional Catholic prayer
 Avenue (disambiguation)
 Aves (disambiguation)